National Revolutionary Party (Pashto: حزب انقلاب ملی Hezb Enqilab Mile) was a political party in the Republic of Afghanistan. The party was founded in 1974 by President Mohammed Daoud Khan, who had seized control of Afghanistan from his first cousin, King Mohammed Zahir Shah, in the bloodless 1973 coup d'état.

The party was formed in an attempt by Daoud to garner support and grassroots backing for his republican regime. Daoud also intended the party to undermine support in Afghanistan for the People's Democratic Party of Afghanistan, who had actually helped him come to power in 1973. To this end, the party sought to be an umbrella organization for all of the factions of the progressive movement in Afghanistan. In order to help the party in its attempt to garner support, all other political parties were banned.

The party was run by a central committee which comprised Major General Ghulam Haidar Rasuli, Defense Minister Sayyid Abd Ullah, Finance Minister Abd Ul Majid, and Professor Abd Ul Quyyum.

The party did not survive the Saur Revolution in April 1978, which saw the overthrow and death of Daoud and his family, and the rise to power of the communist People's Democratic Party of Afghanistan.

References

Banned political parties
Defunct political parties in Afghanistan
Nationalist parties in Afghanistan
Parties of one-party systems
Pashtun nationalism
Republican parties
Secularism in Afghanistan